Serhiy Anatoliyovych Palyukh (born 2 January 1996) is a Ukrainian professional footballer who plays as a centre-back for Metalurh Zaporizhzhia.

References

External links
 Profile on VPK-Ahro Shevchenkivka official website
 

1996 births
Living people
Ukrainian footballers
Ukraine youth international footballers
Association football defenders
FC Dnipro players
FC Ahrobiznes Volochysk players
FC VPK-Ahro Shevchenkivka players
FC Metalurh Zaporizhzhia players
Ukrainian First League players
Ukrainian Second League players
Sportspeople from Dnipropetrovsk Oblast